Newark Township is one of fourteen townships in Kearney County, Nebraska, United States. The population was 204 at the 2020 census. A 2021 estimate placed the township's population at 203.

See also
County government in Nebraska

References

External links
City-Data.com

Townships in Kearney County, Nebraska
Kearney Micropolitan Statistical Area
Townships in Nebraska